Hyde United Football Club is a semi-professional football club in Hyde, Greater Manchester, England. Formed in 1919, they were renamed Hyde F.C. between 2010 and 2015 as part of a sponsorship deal with Manchester City.

The team's strip is red shirts and black shorts and their home ground is the 4,250 capacity Ewen Fields. Hyde United's record attendance was in 1952 when 7,600 spectators attended a game against Nelson. The club's all-time leading goalscorer is Pete O'Brien who scored 247 goals.

History

Hyde F.C.
Hyde F.C. was founded on 27 July 1885 at the White Lion pub in the town centre. They played on a field near the Bankfield Hotel, until 1898 when they moved to Townend Street and set up a club headquarters at the Gardeners Arms pub.  They merged with Hyde St. George's in 1906 and played at Ewen Fields. The club folded in 1917.

Lancashire and Cheshire Federation, Manchester League and Cheshire County League
Hyde United formed in 1919 after demands for a football club to be re-established. After one season in the Lancashire and Cheshire Federation, Hyde joined the Manchester League and by 1930 had won it five times and won the Gilgryst Cup twice. In the 1920s, players wore black-and-white halved shirts for a spell. The club moved into the Cheshire County League in 1930 and won the League Challenge Cup four years later. The decade after the Second World War proved to be a purple patch for the club. In 1946, they won the Cheshire Senior Cup, the first of many trophies to arrive at Ewen Fields during the next ten years. In 1953, Hyde won the League Cup followed by a league and cup double a season later. The 1955–56 season saw the club retain the championship and finish as runners-up in the following three seasons.

They reached the FA Cup first round in 1954 only to lose 5–1 away to Workington, who were at that time managed by Bill Shankly. Hyde were founder members of the Northern Premier League in 1968 but financial strains took their toll and the club rejoined the Cheshire League in 1970 where they remained for 12 years. They won the League Cup in 1973, and in 1981 finished as runners-up in the league and winners of the Cheshire Senior Cup and The League Challenge Shield.

Northern Premier League

A year later, with Les Sutton as manager, Hyde swept the Cheshire League board, and with the installation of a number of supporter's club-financed ground improvements, won election to the Northern Premier League. The first year back saw the club score 91 goals. The following season they reached the first round of the FA Cup where they lost 2–0 at Burnley. with Peter Wragg as manager, also reaching the Northern Premier League Cup final— only to lose on penalties to South Liverpool. However, they were back in the final in 1986 when they beat Marine 1–0.
In 1986, as a result of the changes introduced following the Bradford City stadium fire, the club, in conjunction with Tameside MBC, erected a new main stand and laid a baspoturf pitch.

In 1993, Pete O'Brien was appointed manager for a second time, but only remained in charge until the end of the season, when he resigned to take-over at Droylsden. Mike McKenzie took over from O'Brien in June 1994. His first season in charge showed much future promise when Hyde reached the first round of the FA Cup but then lost 3–1 at home to Darlington, to be followed by elimination from the FA Trophy by Kidderminster Harriers in the semi-final. During the 1995–96 season, Ewen Fields' astroturf pitch was relaid in grass, then played host to another FA Trophy semi-final, this time against Northwich Victoria. After Mike McKenzie left the club in 2001 by mutual consent, former player Dave Nolan took over as manager. After an unsuccessful 2001–02 season, Nolan was sacked. In October 2002 former Manchester United player Gordon Hill was appointed as manager, but remained at the club for only two months. Following his departure, Hyde gave the job to former Leigh boss Steve Waywell, though he could not prevent the club's relegation to the Northern Premier League Division One in 2003. Waywell assembled a new team, and they won the Northern Premier League First Division at their first attempt.

Hyde United won the Northern Premier League Premier Division title in 2005 for the first time in their history, a controversial win as Hyde were awarded the title following an appeal to the Football Association. The title was originally awarded to Farsley Celtic after the expunging of Spennymoor United's results because they were unable to complete their fixtures that season (with a Hyde fixture one of those not played). On appeal, this decision was overturned and Hyde, along with other teams who had not played Spennymoor twice, were awarded three points for a "0–0 win"—sufficient to secure Hyde's first Northern Premier League title.

Football Conference

During their first season in the Conference North league, the Tigers started slowly, but a run of better results mid-season saw them finishing 11th, with 56 points from 42 games. Further mid-table finishes followed in subsequent seasons, then Waywell left the club by mutual consent in October 2008, after a poor start to the season saw Hyde collect only five points from their first eight games and at the same time exit the Conference League Cup in the first round. He was replaced by Neil Tolson along with Chris Brass, who left the club a few months later. Hyde finished the season in 20th place and faced relegation, only to be spared when King's Lynn were demoted for failing to ensure that their home ground met Conference North standards.

On 24 September 2009, the club was officially wound up at the High Court in London, with debts of around £122,000 to HM Revenue and Customs. Over the following few days, major efforts by club officials, supporters and players, which included a bucket collection at a Manchester City Premier League match, raised sufficient funds to lodge an appeal against the High Court decision. This was heard on 30 September 2009, and the original winding-up order was rescinded, with Leicestershire businessman John Manship stepping in as owner.

Hyde finished the 2009–10 season in 15th place after a mid and late season fight back during which they lost only one home fixture. Before the start of the 2010–11 season, the club changed its name to Hyde F.C. and Ewen Fields underwent a complete makeover, turning the ground from red to blue and switching to white shirts and blue shorts as part of a sponsorship deal with Manchester City. In the second half of the season, club chairman Steve Hartley and secretary Tony Beard both resigned from the board, and this was later followed by the sacking of manager Neil Tolson. Tolson was replaced by Scott McNiven and Steve Halford, who acted as joint player-caretaker managers, and Hyde escaped relegation on the last day of the season.

Ahead of the 2011–12 season Hyde appointed Gary Lowe as manager, with Martyn Booty as his assistant. Their first 10 matches of the season saw Hyde win every match, equalling Hyde's best ever start to a season dating back to the 1925–26 season and also breaking the record for the best ever start to a season in Conference North. On the back of this incredible start, Hyde finished the season as Conference North champions following a 4–1 win over Boston United in their last home match of the season, gaining promotion to the Conference Premier for the first time and breaking the club's record for the highest points total in their history with 90 points. Following the end of the season manager Gary Lowe and assistant Martyn Booty resigned, to be replaced by Scott McNiven and Gavin McCann, respectively.

The 2013–14 season was a disastrous one for Hyde FC, losing numerous matches including both the Boxing Day and New Years Day fixtures to Macclesfield Town, both 3–0, including a Scott Boden hat-trick at Ewen Fields.
After a two-year stay in the Conference Premier, the club was relegated back to the Conference North after a 3–0 defeat to Alfreton Town on 11 March 2014. The club only recorded one win in the whole of the 2013–14 campaign— a 2–0 win away at Welling United. They finished the season in 24th place— bottom of the table, gaining only ten points throughout the whole season— a league record low points. With the club nine points adrift at the bottom of the Conference North in January 2015, the club parted company with manager Scott McNiven. McNiven was replaced by former manager, Gary Lowe.

Return to the Northern Premier League
Lowe was not able to prevent a second successive relegation as Hyde finished bottom of the league, returning to the Northern Premier League after ten years in the Football Conference. At the end of the season Hyde's deal with Manchester City ended, and the club's name reverted to Hyde United. On 27 June 2015, the club announced that John Manship had offered to hand over control of the club, it had been successfully taken over by the Hyde United Supporters Club. At the end of March 2016 with Hyde United just 3 points above the drop zone, the decision was taken to part ways with manager Gary Lowe. The interim appointment of Darren Kelly was made to prevent a third successive relegation in three seasons. Kelly was unable to guide the club to safety and they were relegated to the Northern Premier League Division One after a 4–0 defeat at home to Nantwich Town.

The 2019–20 season was cut short in March 2020 due to the coronavirus pandemic, with the Tigers sitting in 10th place having reached the semi finals of the League Cup and Cheshire Senior Cup, both of which failed to be completed.

Colours, crest and sponsorship

In the club's first season; 1919–20, Hyde United players wore a black shirt with white shorts. This was followed by black and white stripes and then red shirts from 1927. Red and white would continue as the club's colours to this day with the exception of 1971–1974 and 2010–11 tangerine shirts and white shirts were used respectively. In 2009, the club announced that they had struck a deal with Pelada, a sporting company, who would supply their kit for the 2009–10 season. In 2010, the club announced that Hyde United F.C. would change its name to Hyde FC and the team's kit would change to white shirt and navy shorts. At a fans' night the following month, the club launched the new kit, announcing that it would be supplied by Umbro and sponsored by Manchester City's City in the Community scheme, which had also been the shirt sponsors for the previous season. Before the start of the 2011–12 season, the club announced that they would be reverting their shirt colour back to red, after just one season in white. The club also announced that the supplier of the kit for 2011–12 was Pelada and the shirt sponsor would stay the same for the third season running, City in the Community. In June 2015, the club announced that they had signed a two-year deal with Macron, who would supply the club's kit. The following month, the club announced a one-year shirt and stadium sponsorship deal with the LADbible website.

The club's crest is an adaptation of the Hyde borough coat of arms. The crest was initially red but was changed to sky blue in 2010 when the club changed its name and kit colours as part of the City in the Community sponsorship deal.

Ground

Hyde play their home games at Ewen Fields, which has a capacity of 4,250 across covered five stands: the Main Stand, the Scrattin' Shed, the Tinker's Passage end, the Leigh Street stand and the Walker Lane end. All provide standing spectator accommodation apart from the Main Stand which has seating for 530. The pitch was relaid as Baspograss, then in 1995 reverted to grass.

The ground held the last non-qualifying FA Cup game on an artificial surface when Hyde faced Darlington in the 1st Round Proper of the 1994–95 FA Cup. Ewen Fields has hosted many sporting teams in the past, with Manchester United Reserves and Stockport County Reserves and Oldham Bears amongst former users. Ewen Fields has also held fixtures for Oldham Curzon Ladies Football Team.

After Hyde United changed their name and strip in 2010, the colour of the ground was changed from red to blue in 2010, in a change funded by Manchester City Football Club. This came about as a result of the two club's partnership whereby Ewen Fields would also be used by Manchester City's Reserve Team.

Rivalries

Hyde have two main rivals, Stalybridge Celtic and Droylsden, of whom Stalybridge Celtic is considered the biggest because Hyde and Stalybridge are geographically adjacent.  Since 1923, the clubs have contested 217 fixtures in all competitions with Hyde winning 95 and Stalybridge 79, while there have been 43 draws. The most notable Hyde win in this fixture was played on 1 January 2007, at Bower Fold where Hyde came out as 7–3 winners with Hyde striker Gareth Seddon scoring five goals. Hyde's highest home attendance for this fixture is 1,868 in a Conference North match in 2011, a match that saw both sides begin the match 1st and 2nd in the league, and ended in a 1–1 draw. Since 1980, Hyde's all-time top goalscorer in this fixture is Alan Rogers with eighteen goals to his name.

Scarborough Athletic could be also considered as a rivalry as Hyde fans chant 'we all hate Scarborough' though this has only occurred in recent years following an FA Cup 4th Qualifying Round match in 2017.

Players

Current squad
 Updated 23 Sept 2022.

Former players
See :Category:Hyde United F.C. players to see a list of Hyde players, past and present.

Club officials

Coaching staff

Manager: Nicky Spooner
Assistant Manager: Martin Coyne
First Team Coach: Gavin McCann 
Goalkeeper Coach: Chris Shaw
Fitness Coach: Nick Donolley
First Team Physio: Lucy Graves

Former managers
This is a list of all Hyde managers post World War II:

League memberships
As of Apr 2020.

Key

Seasons

Records
Club Records
Record Attendance – 7,600 vs. Nelson in 1952 in the FA Cup.
Record Victory – 13–1 vs. Eccles United in 1921–22.
Record Northern Premier League Victory – 9–1 vs. South Liverpool in 1990–91.
Heaviest Northern Premier League Defeat – 6–0 vs. Stalybridge Celtic in 2002–03.
Player Records
Most Appearances for Club – Steve Johnson; 600-plus.
Most Goals for Club – Pete O'Brien; 247.
Most Goals in a Season – Ernest Gillibrand; 86 in 1929–30 season.
Most Goals in a Game – Ernest Gillibrand 7 vs. New Mills in the 1929–30 season.
Largest Transfer Fee Received – £50,000 for Colin Little to Crewe Alexandra in 1995.
Largest Transfer Fee Paid – £8,000 for Jim McCluskie from Mossley in 1989.

Honours
The list of Honours that Hyde have achieved is as follows:

League
Conference North
2011–12
Northern Premier League
2004–05
Northern Premier League Division One
2003–04
Cheshire League
1954–55, 1955–56, 1981–82
Manchester League
1920–21, 1921–22, 1922–23, 1928–29, 1929–30

Cup
FA Cup
First Round 1955–56, 1983–84, 1994–95, 2017–18
FA Trophy
Semi Finals 1988–89, 1994–95, 1995–96
Cheshire Senior Cup
Winners 1945–46, 1962–63, 1969–70, 1980–81, 1989–90, 1996–97
Manchester Premier Cup
Winners 1993–94, 1994–95, 1995–96, 1998–99, 2004–05, 2005–06
Manchester Senior Cup
Winners 1974–75
Northern Premier League Challenge Cup
Winners 1985–86, 1989–90, 1995–96
Northern Premier League Chairman's Cup
Winners 1999–2000, 2003–04
Cheshire League Cup
Winners 1933–34, 1952–53, 1954–55, 1972–73, 1981–82

See also
Ray Stanley Memorial Trophy

Notes

References

External links

Hyde United F.C. official website

 
Football clubs in England
Football clubs in Tameside
Fan-owned football clubs in England
Association football clubs established in 1919
1919 establishments in England
Lancashire League (football)
The Combination
Lancashire Combination
Northern Premier League clubs
National League (English football) clubs
Cheshire County League clubs